Əli Bayramlı may refer to:

Şirvan, Azerbaijan, Azerbaijan
Əli Bayramlı, Zaqatala, Azerbaijan 
Əli Bayramlı, Kalbajar, Azerbaijan
Əli Bayramlı, Qakh, Azerbaijan
Əli Bayramlı, Qazakh, Azerbaijan
Əli Bayramlı, Samukh, Azerbaijan
Yeni Əlibayramlı, Azerbaijan